The Indiana Woman's Suffrage Association (IWSA) began on October 15, 1851, in Dublin, Wayne County, Indiana. IWSA was created for men and women to fight for women's right to vote. The association held annual conventions for 26 years. People traveled from all over the state to find resolutions for the political, social, and financial inequalities for women. The ISWA was first referred to as American Woman Suffrage Association.

The Constitution

Article I 

This society shall be known by the name of the Indiana Woman's Rights Suffrage Association.

Article II 

The officers of this society shall consist of a president, vice president, corresponding and recording secretaries and treasurer, whose duties shall be such as devolve upon such stations, and they shall be elected annually.

Article III 

The Secretary, further, shall be requested to report annually upon the general condition of woman and the efforts made for her elevation.

Article IV 

Persons shall be appointed at each annual meeting to report upon each of the following subjects: Woman's Labor and Remuneration, Woman's Legal Condition; Woman's Social Position, and Woman's education.

Article V 

This society shall meet annually at such time and place as shall hereafter be determined upon.

Article VI 

This society does advise the organization of District societies throughout the State.

Article VII 

The constitution may be altered or amended at any regular meeting of the society.

The first meetings

October 14, 1851

Morning session 
The meeting started off by elected a president, vice president, and secretary. Hannah Hiatt was the first president, Amanda Way was the first vice president, and Henry Hiatt was the first secretary. Hannah Hiatt requested that the new vice president make the opening address of the meeting. During that speech, Amanda M. Way stated that the "object of the meeting, and declaring that unless women demand their rights politically, socially and financially, they will continue in the future as in the past, to be classed with negroes, criminals, insane person, idiots, and infants." Henry B. Wright, who was a great antislavery lecturer, was called for and made a radical, striving speech, after which the convention closed until the next day.

Evening session 
Hannah Hiatt called the convention to order. After preliminary business was discussed, Hiatt introduced H. C. Wright. Wright showed the injustice in property laws, inequality of wages, and the insulting cruelty of shutting the doors of the high school and colleges against women.

October 15, 1851

Morning session 
Amanda Way started the meeting by reading a letter from Dr. Mary F. Thomas of North Manchester and Elizabeth Matchett of Goshen. They read all of the resolutions for the amendments and after some discussion, there were all adopted. The members of the convention took the position that all class legislation is unjust and that all who are governed by laws should help make those laws. H. C. Wright gave another speech.

Afternoon session 
There were speeches given by Joel P. Garris, M. R. Hiatt, H. C. Wright, Henry Hiatt, and others. The members of the association decided to hold another convention in a year. They selected Richmond as the place.

People to remember

People who held positions

President 
Notable women who were President 

 Hannah Hiatt (the first President)
 L. W. Vandeburg (Lydia)
 Dr. Amelia B. Keller
 Anna D. Noland
 Helen M. Gougar

Vice president 
Notable women who were vice president of IWHA

 Amanda Way
 Jane Marrow

Secretary 
Notable people who were Secretary of IWHA

 Henry Hiatt
 Mary B. Birdsall

Influential people

These people signed the Constitution, or made speeches at the meetings 

H. C. Wright (Henry Clark)
 Wright made many influential speeches during the first few meetings. He made a "thrilling speech based upon the Declaration of Independence that all men are created equal.' He showed how men had made the laws so that women were little better than slaves, the husband not only owning all the property but the children and the wife too."
 Joel P. Harris
 G. A. Way
 Lydia Davis
 M. J. Diggs (Melissa)
 Fanny Hiatt
 Agnes Cook

References

Women's suffrage advocacy groups in the United States
Defunct organizations based in Indiana
Organizations established in 1851
Indiana Women's Rights Movement